Bates Australia is a leading saddle manufacturer originally established in 1934. Bates Saddlery was formed when Mr. George Bates borrowed $100 from his sister, bought a sewing machine and began to make saddles on the veranda of his home in Perth, Western Australia. Bates Australia is the parent company to Bates Saddles and Wintec.

The family-owned business, located in Perth, Western Australia, has expanded into many international markets and can now be found in 36 countries around the world.

References

External links
Bates Australia
Wintec Website

Saddle manufacturers
Manufacturing companies of Australia
Australian companies established in 1934
Multinational companies headquartered in Australia
Companies based in Perth, Western Australia
Privately held companies of Australia